Darkened Nocturn Slaughtercult is a German-Polish black metal band from Dormagen. They are considered to be a traditional black metal band, and as such has been interviewed in 2006 by the Franco-German TV network Arte.

Members

Current members
 Onielar (Yvonne Wilczynska) - vocals, rhythm guitar (1997–present)
 Velnias (Sven Galinsky) - lead guitar (1998–present)
 Horrn (Michael Pelkowsky) - drums, percussions (2001–present)
 R. K. (René Kögel) - bass (2019–present)

Former members
 Ariovist - drums, percussions (1997-1999)
 Thymos - bass (1997-1999)
 Grigorr - bass (1999-2002; 2008-2009)
 Emporonorr - bass (2002-2006)
 Necropest - bass (2006-2008)
 Adversarius (Tobias Lachmann) - bass (2009–2019)

Timeline

Discography
The Pest Called Humanity / Pyre -  Luciferian Dark Age (Split album, 1999)
Follow the Calls for Battle (2001)
Underneath Stars of the East / Emptyness (Split album, 2003)
Nocturnal March (2004)
Hora Nocturna (2006)
Evoking A Decade (Collectors Edition, double mCD,2008)
Saldorian Spell (2009)
Legion Of Chaos (Split LP with Purgatory)Necrovision (2013)Darkened Bižuterija (Split LP with Jelena Rozga) (2015)Mardom'' (2019)

References

External links

 
 

German black metal musical groups
Musical groups established in 1997